Dionne Warwick Sings Cole Porter is a studio album by American singer Dionne Warwick. Her ninth album for Arista Records, it was released on 	June 11, 1990 in the United States. A tribute to American composer and songwriter Cole Porter, Warwick worked with Arif Mardin on the album, which consists of several of Cole's jazz standards that he had written during the 1930s through 1950s, including "Night and Day", "You're the Top" and "I've Got You Under My Skin." Released to contrasting reviews, it reached number 155 on the US Billboard 200.

Background
In 1987, Warwick released Reservations for Two, her eighth album with Arista Records. Though the album produced the top 20 hit single "Love Power," a duet with Jeffrey Osborne, it failed to reprise the success of previous album Friends (1985) and missed the top fifty on the US Billboard 200. Producer Arif Mardin suggested making a jazz-inflected album of Cole Porter renditions with Warwick next. While the pair recorded a first version in that fashion, Arista head Clive Davis found that the result "sounded too much like a cabaret recording" since he was looking for a ballroom-style sound for the album instead. Warwick and Mardin were forced to rerecord the album, resulting in an overall sound which Warwick first considered "very vanilla," though she later expressed her pride in the project, thinking of it as "one of [her] best works." In 1990, Dionne Warwick Sings Cole Porter won her the first Cole Porter Centennial Award, "You're the Top", given in recognition of outstanding achievements for sustaining the Cole Porter Legend.

Critical reception

Dionne Warwick Sings Cole Porter earned contrasting reviews from music critics. People found that "though not altogether a trip to the moon on gossamer wings, it’s still a wonderfully buoyant endeavor. With a voice that sounds like coffee percolating, Warwick charges her way through 13 of Porter’s intoxicating, seductive hits [...] Strange, dear, but true, dear, the unusual combination of Warwick and Porter works. For a singer who’s primarily known for her pop sound, Warwick does a surprisingly fine job of putting over Porter’s wry, elegant lyrics." Stephen Holden from The New York Times sumed the album as "sedate, homogenized ballroom style of traditional pop [...]."

Ron Wynn from AllMusic called Dionne Warwick Sings Cole Porter "a grand idea, but Warwick didn't meet the challenge as magically as she might have in the 1960s or '70s. Instead, she sounded almost prim and stiff instead of engaging and confident [...] It was still worth hearing, but far from the anticipated triumph." Greg Sandow Entertainment Weeklys Amy Linden wrote that "it can’t be easy for seasoned professionals to squeeze the life out of 11 airy Cole Porter songs. But Dionne Warwick and her arranger Arif Mardin come amazingly close to doing just that. Most of the fault is Warwick’s. She can sing the songs, in a voice that rides with brassy equilibrium over the highest arch of their often-challenging melodies. But she doesn’t brighten them."

Commercial performance
The album debuted at number 172 on the US Billboard 200 in the week ending August 18, 1990. It peaked at number 155 on September 15, 1990, its fifth week on the chart. This marked Warwick's lowest peak for one of her regular studio albums since Love at First Sight (1977), her final album with Warner Bros. Records.

Track listing
All tracks written by Cole Porter and produced by Arif Mardin.

Charts

References

Dionne Warwick albums
1990 albums
albums produced by Arif Mardin
Arista Records albums
Cole Porter tribute albums